"Ma révolution" is the name of a 2004 song, the fifth single released by the French singer Jenifer Bartoli, and the first one from her second studio album Le Passage, on which it features as first track. It was the more successful song from it, reaching the top ten in France and Belgium (Wallonia).

Song information
This song is actually a French-language adaptation of I'Dees' song "Black Coffee And A Stranger". It was also performed during Jenifer's first tour, and was thus included on the live album Jenifer fait son live (18th track). The song was dedicated to the singer's son and the music video was shot in Paris in April 2004. The B-side of the CD single, "Qui ment", was an unreleased song that was not available on Jenifer's first album.

In France, the single entered at a peak of number nine on 6 June 2004 and reached this position another time. It dropped slowly on the chart and remained for three weeks in the top ten, 17 weeks in the top 50 and 22 weeks in the top 100. It featured at number 44 on the End of the Year Chart.

In Belgium, the single charted for 13 weeks, from 19 June 2004. It started at number 17 and peaked at number nine, totalling ten weeks in the top 20. It was the 38th best-selling single of 2004.

The song also featured for 13 weeks in the Swiss Singles Chart. After a debut at number 45 on 20 June, it jumped to a peak at number 21, then dropped rather quickly on the chart.

Track listings
 CD single
 "Ma révolution" (single version) — 3:12
 "Qui ment" (Tristan Leroy/Maxim Nucci) — 3:21

 CD single - Digipack
 "Ma révolution" — 3:12
 "Qui ment" — 3:21
 "Ma révolution" (video)

 Digital download
 "Ma révolution" — 3:12
 "Ma révolution" (2005 live version) — 4:54

Credits

Production
"Ma révolution"
Produced by Andreas Karlegård & Martin Karlegård for KBros
Engineered by KBros at The Aerosol Grey Machine, Vollsjö, KBros Studio, Stockholm, Studio Ramsès 2, Paris & Westlake Audio, Los Angeles
"Qui ment"
Produced by Maxim Nucci
Engineered at Studio Méga, Suresnes & Studio Plus XXX, Paris
Mixed by Bob Clearmountain at Mix This, Pacific Palisades
Assistant mixing: Kevin Harp
Mastered by Miles Showell at Metropolis Mastering, London

Design
Azim Haidaryan: photography
Barilla.design: cover design

Charts

Peak positions

End of year charts

References

External links
 "Ma révolution", lyrics

2004 singles
Jenifer (singer) songs
2004 songs
Mercury Records singles
Universal Records singles